Brian Andrew Wilbur (born October 26, 1986 in Boring, Oregon) is an American football player and is the starting quarterback for the Granada Lions of the Asocación Andaluza de Fútbol Americano, for whom he has played in three separate seasons: 2007, 2010, and 2014.

Early career 

Wilbur played football at 3A powerhouse Ferndale High School in Ferndale, Washington.
He went on to attend the University of Puget Sound, but chose not to play college football, concentrating on lacrosse instead, where he earned multiple all-conference awards as the starting goalkeeper for the Loggers.

International career 

Wilbur began playing football in Granada while studying abroad in 2007. After graduation from college, he returned in 2010 for a second season and was named the 2010 Andalucian league MVP.

Wilbur was recruited by the Montpellier Hurricanes of France to serve as quarterback and offensive coordinator for the 2013 season.

In 2014, he was again called up by the Granada Lions to serve as quarterback after the Lions qualified for the Serie A of Spain's national football league.

References

People from Boring, Oregon
1986 births
Living people
Players of American football from Oregon
American football quarterbacks